Pilcrow is a novel by Adam Mars-Jones first published in 2008 by Faber.

Plot
The book is in the form of a memoir by an adult John Cromer telling the story of his childhood and adolescence in the '50s and early '60s. He develops Still's disease at an early age and is confined to bed under a misdiagnosis of rheumatic fever. When the nature of his disease is finally realised he is transferred to the Canadian Red Cross Memorial Hospital in Taplow, Berkshire under the care of Dr. Barbara Ansell but by then he has very little movement left in his joints. Later he moves to a special school in Farley Castle where he is reliant on the 'able-bodied' to help him move around, and realises that he is homosexual.

Reception
It has received mixed reviews; as James Wood comments in the London Review of Books, 'Pilcrow is a peculiar, original, utterly idiosyncratic book. It is admirably courageous, both in what it heaps on us, and in what it holds back. While it drops us deep into the every day, it boldly refuses the every day consolations of plot and dramatic structure.'

Continuation
The book finishes with John Cromer at the age of sixteen. The next installment of his life is called Cedilla and was published in 2011.

References

External links

Book Reviews - Pilcrow by Adam Mars-Jones  gives links to reviews from The Observer, New Statesman, Times Literary Supplement, The Guardian, The Sunday Times, The Independent and The Daily Telegraph.

2008 British novels
Novels with gay themes
Novels about diseases and disorders
Novels set in Berkshire
British bildungsromans
Medical novels
Faber and Faber books
British LGBT novels
2000s LGBT novels
2008 LGBT-related literary works